Headphone Dust is an English independent record label founded by the musician Steven Wilson. It's almost entirely focused on releasing Wilson's own music as well as his remixes of other artists. The only exception to this is the Irish band Fovea Hex.

Artists
 Bass Communion
 Blackfield
 Fovea Hex
 Incredible Expanding Mindfuck
 No-Man
 Porcupine Tree
 Steven Wilson

Discography 

 Blackfield - Blackfield II (CD)
 Blackfield - Blackfield II (vinyl)
 Blackfield - Blackfield I (CD)
 Blackfield - Blackfield I (vinyl) (2 LP)
 Bass Communion - Loss (CD+DVDA)
 Bass Communion/Muslimgauze - bcvsmgcd (CD)
 Steven Wilson - Cover Versions I, II, III, IV and V (CD)
 Steven Wilson - Unreleased Electronic Music (CDR)
 Steven Wilson - Unreleased Electronic Music (2 LP)
 Steven Wilson - Cover Versions III & IV (2x7" single, either small or jukebox style center-holes)
 Bass Communion - I (CD)
 Bass Communion - II (CD)
 Bass Communion - Ghosts on Magnetic Tape (CD)
 Bass Communion - Ghosts on Magnetic Tape (2 LP)
 Bass Communion - Dronework (CDR)
 Continuum - Continuum Recyclings (2 LP)
 Continuum - Continuum II (CD)
 IEM - IEM: 1996-1999 (CD)
 IEM - Arcadia Son (LP)
 No-Man - Returning Jesus (3 LP)
 No-Man - Together We're Stranger (LP)
 Porcupine Tree - On the Sunday of Life (2 LP)
 Porcupine Tree - Stupid Dream (2 LP)
 Porcupine Tree - Fear of a Blank Planet
 Bass Communion - Pacific Codex
 Fovea Hex - The Salt Garden 1 (LP+CD)
 Fovea Hex - The Salt Garden 2 (LP+CD)

See also 
 List of independent UK record labels
 List of record labels

References

External links 
 Headphone Dust official website

Record labels based in London